Vinkovci Technical College of Adult Education is adult education institution based in Vinkovci, Croatia. Institution offer courses in primary, secondary, vocational and programs of information technology education. Institution have two additional campuses in Vukovar and Ilok. In its work, institution collaborates with local Croatian Employment Service through their public tenders.

Partner institutions
, Zagreb, Algebra College

See also
Vinkovci
Adult education
List of institutions of higher education in Croatia

External links
Official website

References

Education in Croatia
Schools in Croatia
Adult education
Secondary schools in Croatia
Vinkovci
Schools in Vukovar-Srijem County